Big Bamboo or Big Bambu may refer to:

Music

 Big Bamboo, a calypso song with versions by Lord Creator, The Merrymen, and Mighty Sparrow
 Big Bamboo, a record by Seamus Moore (singer)
 Big Bam Boo a British pop duo

Other uses

 The Big Bamboo, a novel by Tim Dorsey.
 BigBamboo LLC, a holding company chaired by Stephen Meade
 Big Bamboo Lounge, a former bar in Kissimmee, Florida 
 Big Bamboo Peak, a fictional group in Zhu Xian (novel)
 Big Bambu, a brand of cigarette rolling paper made by Bambu (rolling papers)
 Big Bambu, an album by comedians Cheech & Chong
 Big Bambú, an art installation by  Doug and Mike Starn

See also
 Bamboo (disambiguation)
 Bambú (disambiguation)
 Bambu (disambiguation)